Likhmidas (8 July 1750 – 8 September 1830) is a noted saint from Rajasthan belonging to Rajput Mali community. He  is believed to did many miracles during his lifetime.

He was married and had two sons and daughter and lived in Nagaur. His ishta-devata was Ramdevji. He has written many bhajans and dohas, which are very popular today.

There are many followers of him, especially in Rajasthan. The main temple of him is located at Amarpura near Nagaur, where he took live samadhi. The renovated large temple with pran-pratishtha of idol of Likhmidasji was inaugurated by erstwhile Chief Minister of Rajasthan, Vasundhara Raje on 6 December 2016.

References

1750 births
1830 deaths
Indian Hindu saints
People from Nagaur